Purnia District is one of the thirty-eight districts of the Indian state of Bihar. The city of Purnia is the administrative headquarters of this district. The city of Purnia has continued its tradition of hoisting the national flag at 12:07 am on every Independence Day since 1947. Purnia district is a part of Purnia Division.  The district extends northwards from the Ganges river.

History
Purnia is part of the Mithila region. Mithila first gained prominence after it was settled by Indo-Aryan peoples who established the Mithila Kingdom (also called Kingdom of the Videhas).

During the late Vedic period (c. 1100–500 BCE), Videha became one of the major political and cultural centers of Ancient India, along with Kuru and Pañcāla. The kings of the Videha Kingdom were called Janakas. The Videha Kingdom was later incorporated into the Vajji confederacy, which had its capital in the city of Vaishali, which is also in Mithila.

During the Mughal rule, Purnea was an outlying military province, and its revenue was mostly spent on protecting its borders against tribes from the north and east. After the capture of Calcutta in 1757, Purnia's local governor raised a rebellion against Siraj ud-Daulah. In 1765, the district became a British possession, along with the rest of Bengal. On February 14, 1770 the district of Purnia in modern history was formed by the East India Company.

Purnia is known for its uniquely designed organization, Ramakrishna Mission, where the festival called Durga Puja is celebrated in October. Another attraction in the city of Purnia is the oldest temple of Mata Puran Devi which is 5 km away from the main city. It is theorized that Purnia received its name from this temple. Other theories also describe how Purnia received its name; which is, that in the past Purnia was named Purna– Aranya, which stands for "complete jungle."

Three districts were partitioned off from Purnia district: Katihar in 1976, Araria and Kishanganj in 1990.

Geography
Purnia district occupies , comparable to the Solomon Islands' Makira Island. It is a depressed tract, consisting for the most part of a rich, loamy alluvial soil. It is traversed by several rivers flowing from the Himalayas, which afford great advantages of irrigation and water-carriage.  Its major rivers are the Kosi, the Mahananda, the Suwara Kali, the Kari kosi, the Saura and the Koli. In the west, the soil is thickly covered with sand deposited by changes in the course of the Kosi. Among other rivers are the Mahananda and the Panar. Its major agricultural products are jute and banana.

Divisions
Purnia district has four subdivisions: Purnea Sadar, Banmankhi, Baisi and Dhamdaha.

Blocks
They are further divided into fourteen blocks: 
Purnia East
Kasba
Jalalgarh
Krityanand Nagar
Srinagar
Banmankhi
Dhamdaha
Barhara Kothi
Bhawanipur
Rupauli
Baisi
Baisa
Amour
Dagarua
These contain 246 panchayats with 1,450 villages.

Demographics

According to the 2011 census Purnia district has a population of 3,264,619, roughly equal to the nation of Mauritania or the US state of Iowa. This gives it a ranking of 105th in India (out of a total of 640). Its population growth rate over the decade 2001-2011 was  28.66%. Purnia has a sex ratio of 930 females for every 1000 males, and a literacy rate of 58.23%. 10.51% of the population lives in urban areas. Scheduled Castes and Scheduled Tribes make up 11.98% and 4.27% of the population respectively.

Hindus are the majority community, but Muslims are majority in the eastern blocks such as Kasba, Amour, Dagarua, Baisa and Baisi. 

At the time of the 2011 Census of India, 33.68% of the population in the district spoke Hindi, 18.62% Urdu, 10.72% Maithili, 8.73% Surjapuri, 4.51% Bengali and 2.50% Santali as their first language. 18.53% spoke languages recorded as 'Others' under Hindi on the census.

Politics 
  

|}

Economy
Recently, Oil and Natural Gas Corporation  has started exploring Purnia basin for crude oil and Natural gas reserves. Estimations show that there might be about 465 million tonnes of reserves in the basin.

Culture

Shrines
Some major Hindu temples of Purnea are Puran Devi temple; which is sometimes credited for the name of the city, the Kali Mandir of old Purnia city on the bank of Saura river, the Maata Asthan in Chunapur, Panchmukhi Temple in line bazaar, the Rani Sati Mandir in Kasba, Prahlad Stambh in Banmankhi, and Dhima Shiv Mandir in Dhima, Banmankhi. The city also has the Darghah of Hazrat Mustafa Jamalul Haque Bandagi, Chimni Bazar. An "Urs" in the form of Mela ( village fair) is organized on the 7th day after Eid-Ul-Azha and continues up to 3 days every year. The 'Dargah and Khanquah Alia Mustafia' is located 7 km away from the main city. It is famous for spirituality, communal harmony and Sufism. Its history extends for 400 years, when Hazrat Bandagi came from Jaunpur, Uttar Pradesh visiting several Khanqahs and Dargahs across India such as the Pandawa Sharif, the Bihar Sharif, etc. The Darghah is playing a major role to spread culture, education, kindness, secularism and spiritual spirits in Northeast Bihar since its establishment. Deorhi at Garbanili (Purnea) hosts the ruins of Kala Bhawan the ancient Darbar (Palace) of Raja Kalanand Singh, where his successor still lives.

The Jalalgadh Fort is a place of historical importance situated in Jalalgadh division.

References

External links
 Official website
Purnia Information Portal

List of Freedom Fighters of Purnea District

1. Shri Jibatsh Sharma 'Himanshu' native of Kajha Village, Block Krityanand Nagar, District Purnea

 
1770 establishments in India
Districts of Bihar
Minority Concentrated Districts in India
Purnia division